Kokhav Nolad 5 was the 5th season of the popular reality TV show Kokhav Nolad, which focused on finding the next Israeli pop star. It was hosted by Tzvika Hadar with judges Gal Uchovsky, Margalit Tzan'ani, Svika Pik, and Tsedi Tzarfati.

The final of Kokhav Nolad 5 was held on Golan Beach in the eastern side of the kinneret lake (in the west side is the city of Tiberias) on August 29, 2007. After the first semifinal, Zvika Hadar announced that Marina Maximillian Blumin had qualified. In the second semifinal Boaz Ma'uda won first place in his bracket. Chen Aharoni went into a head-to-head with Shlomi Bar'el, with Shlomi coming out as the victor. As such Marina, Boaz, and Shlomi were the final three contestants. a first for the series was the participation of Miriam Tukan, in the fifth season, becoming the first Arab participant of Kokhav Nolad.

Bo'az Ma'uda won with 50% of the vote, Marina Maximilian Blumin - 27% was runner and Shlomi Bar'el third with 23% of the vote.
Bar'el went on to sign a contract with Hed Arzi Music and Blumin with Helicon Records. In addition, Chen Aharoni and Adir Ohayon, reached deals with NMC Music.

Participants

Live shows

See also
Kokhav Nolad
American Idol

Kokhav Nolad seasons
2007 in Israel
2007 in music
2007 Israeli television seasons